Reich Defense Commissioner (German: Reichsverteidigungskommissar, RVK) was a governmental position created in Nazi Germany at the outbreak of World War II on 1 September 1939. Charged with overall defense of the territory of the German Reich, there was originally one Reich Defense Commissioner for each of 15 Wehrkreise (Military Districts). On 16 November 1942, the geographical scope was reduced to the Gau level, raising the number of Reich Defense Commissioners to 42.

Establishment on 1 September 1939

The office of Reich Defense Commissioner was created by the “Ordinance on the Appointment of Reich Defense Commissioners” issued by the Council of Ministers for Defense of the Reich on 1 September 1939. The Reich Defense Commissioners were subordinate to this council and were under the direct supervision of the Reichsminister of the Interior, a member of the Council in his capacity as Generalbevollmächtigter für die Verwaltung  (General Plenipotentiary for Administration). One Reich Defense Commissioner was appointed for each of the 15 Wehrkreise (Military Districts) that served as the headquarters of a German Army corps. Each appointee was a Gauleiter of the Nazi Party. In addition, most all held the highest governmental position in their jurisdiction, usually being either a Reichsstatthalter (Reich Governor) of a German State or an Oberpräsident (High President) of a Prussian province. (The Commissioners of the two Austrian Wehrkreis would be elevated to the rank of Reichstatthalter in April 1940.) One Commissioner, the Bavarian Interior Minister, headed the two military districts that together comprised the Free State of Bavaria. 

Reich Defense Commissioners appointed on 1 September 1939:

 * Army motorized corps XIV, XV, XVI and XIX had no corresponding specific Wehrkreis.

All aspects of civil defense were entrusted to the Reich Defense Commissioners. They were expected to work in close coordination with the military district commanders. They were charged with management and coordination of all civil administrative agencies within their jurisdictions, and thereby had the power to issue instructions to all civil authorities in their districts in matters of Reich defense. In the early war years this mainly involved responsibility for air raid defense preparations and for organizing the evacuation of any endangered areas. It also involved responsibilities in the area of managing the war economy, with significant control over labor deployment, exemptions from military service, housing allocation and enforcement of wartime rationing.

Expansion of October 1939
In late October 1939, after the invasion and conquest of Poland, two new Wehrkreise were formed out of the annexed Polish territory and two additional Reich Defense Commissioners were named:

Reorganization of 16 November 1942
Because the military districts were not necessarily geographically contiguous with the various Party Gaue, German States, or Prussian provinces, conflicts with those Gauleiters and civil authorities who had not been appointed Reich Defense Commissioners often arose. In order to defuse these increasingly sharp conflicts in the course of the war, the "Ordinance on the Reich Defense Commissioners and the Unification of Economic Administration" of 16 November 1942 decreed each Party Gau to be a Reich Defense District. Each Gauleiter now was assigned the additional position of a Reich Defense Commissioner, and the cadre of 17 commissioners expanded to 42. This resulted in increased power for all Gauleiters, as economic councils and armaments commissions conformed to the new Reich Defense Districts.

Activities in the final phase of the war
The autonomy and power of the Reich Defense Commissioners was increased by their involvement in the total war campaign, which Joseph Goebbels authorized on 25 July 1944 as Reich Plenipotentiary for Total War. The Reich Defense Commissioners were charged with maximizing the mobilization of all internal manpower resources by registering men and women between the ages of sixteen and sixty for war-related work assignments.

In the final phase of the war, when the territory of the Reich was invaded, the office of Reich Defense Commissioner contributed significantly to the expansion of power of the Gauleiters. In October 1944 when the Nazi militia, the Volkssturm, was created, its enrollment, organization and leadership was put under the direct control of the Gauleiters in their capacity as Reich Defense Commissioners. 

The territorial authority of the military command extended ten kilometers behind the front line. To the rear of this line, all measures not of a purely military nature — even the construction of defensive fortifications — were under the authority of the Reich Defense Commissioners, who were responsible for carrying them out with the aid of the civilian population and the Volkssturm.  In many instances the Wehrmacht attempted to intervene, while the Reich Defense Commissioners jealously guarded their prerogatives. The atmosphere between the two authorities tended to be highly strained and often contributed to conflicting and contradictory orders. 

In the end, the Reich Defense Commissioners confronted dwindling manpower resources and materiel in the face of powerful offensives by the Allied powers, and were unable to significantly contribute to staving off the impending defeat of the Reich. The position of Reich Defense Commissioner disappeared with the fall of the Nazi regime.

References

Bibliography

1939 establishments in Germany
1945 disestablishments in Germany